"Follow Me Down" is a song by American duo 3OH!3 featuring English singer Neon Hitch from the album Almost Alice (2010).

Charts

References

2010 songs
3OH!3 songs
Alice in Wonderland (franchise)
Music based on Alice in Wonderland
Songs written for films
Songs written by Nathaniel Motte
Songs written by Sean Foreman
Songs written by Neon Hitch